Philip Fracassi is an American writer of horror, thriller, and science fiction. He has written multiple novels, screenplays, and short stories. His 2021 collection of short stories, Beneath a Pale Sky, was nominated for the Bram Stoker Award for Best Fiction Collection. The short story "Death, My Old Friend", featured in this collection, was optioned in 2022 by Christopher Riggert for a feature film adaptation.

Bibliography

Novels 

 The Egotist (1999)
 A Child Alone With Strangers (2022, Skyhorse)
 Don’t Let Them Get You Down (2022, Zagava)
 Gothic (2023, Cemetery Dance)
 Boys in the Valley (2023, Tor Nightfire)

Novellas, novelettes, and short stories 

 Mother (2015)
 Altar (2016)
 Shiloh (2017)
 Sacculina (2017)
 “Ateuchus" (2018)
 Commodore (2021)
 "Death, My Old Friend" (2021)
 "The Guardian" (2021)

Short story anthologies and collections 

 Behold the Void (2017)
 The Midnight Exhibit, Vol. 1 (2020)
 The Nightside Codex (2020, "As I Sit To Write This Story")
 Beneath a Pale Sky (2021)
 The Bad Book (2021, "Marmalade")
 Slice of Paradise: A Beach Vacation Horror Anthology (2022, "The Guardian)
 Revelations: Horror Writers for Climate Action (2022, "The Guardian)
 Hybrid: Misfits, Monsters and Other Phenomena (2022, "My Father's Ashes")
 No One is Safe (2023)

Other work 

 Tomorrow's Gone (2021, poetry collection)
 The Boy with the Blue Rose Heart (2022, children's fiction)

Screenplays 

 Santa Paws 2: The Santa Pups (2012)
 Girl Missing (2015)

Awards and honors 
Fracassi's work has been nominated for and received multiple awards and honors.

 Short Story Collection of the Year from This Is Horror (2017, won, Behold the Void)
 Charles Dexter Award from Strange Aeons Magazine (2018, won, Behold the Void)
 Ignotus Award for Best Foreign Story (2019, finalist, "The Horse Thief")
 Best Horror Story Collections of 2021 from Tor Nightfire (Beneath a Pale Sky)
 Best Collection of the Year from Rue Morgue Magazine (2021, won, Beneath a Pale Sky)
 Bram Stoker Award for Best Fiction Collection (2021, nominated for Beneath a Pale Sky)

References

External links 

 

21st-century American male writers
21st-century American novelists
21st-century American poets
21st-century American short story writers
American horror novelists
American male novelists
American male poets
American male screenwriters
American male short story writers
Living people